Sharp Grossmont Hospital is located in La Mesa, California, United States. It is the largest healthcare facility in East San Diego County with a service area covering 750 square miles. The property is owned by Grossmont Healthcare District, which has leased it to Sharp HealthCare since 1991. Sharp HealthCare, however, manages all hospital operations as a separate entity.

Overview
Sharp Grossmont Hospital, located in San Diego, is a 536-bed hospital that provides medical and surgical care, intensive care, sub-acute and long-term care, rehabilitation and emergency services.

Sharp Grossmont Hospital is the largest health care facility in East San Diego County with programs in emergency and critical care, cardiac care, orthopedics, rehabilitation, behavioral health, neurology, women's health, children's health and hospice care.

More than two-thirds of the hospital's acute-care beds are private.

Services
 Behavioral Health Services
 Cardiovascular Services
 David & Donna Long Cancer Center
 Emergency and Critical Care Center
 Endoscopy Services
 Grossmont Plaza Surgery Center
 Hospice
 Hyperbaric Oxygen Therapy
 Infusion Center
 Limb Preservation Program
 Massage and Healing Touch Therapies
 Mental Health Services
 Neonatal Intensive Care Unit
 Nutrition Counseling
 Orthopedic Services
 Outpatient Imaging Center
 Palliative Care Services
 Pre-Anesthesia Evaluation Services (PAES)
 Pulmonary Services
 Radiology and Diagnostic Imaging
 Rehabilitation Services
 Robotic Surgery (da Vinci Surgical System)
 Senior Services
 Sharp Grossmont Hospital Care Clinic
 Skilled Nursing Facilities
 Sleep Disorders Center
 Spiritual Care Services
 Stroke Center
 Thoracic (Lung) Surgery
 Women's Health Center
 Wound Healing Center and Hyperbaric Medicine

Medical firsts
 The David & Donna Long Cancer Center is the first center in San Diego County to implement the TomoTherapy Hi-Art System, a radiation treatment device with a built-in computerized tomography (CT) scanner.
 Sharp Grossmont opened the first hospice house in San Diego, known as the LakeView Home, offering in-home end-of-life care.
 First in San Diego County to have a computerized tomography scanner with three-dimensional radiation treatment capabilities and dose calculations.
 In 1993, the first East [San Diego County] outpatient cardiovascular diagnosis center opened at Sharp Grossmont Hospital as part of the Cardiovascular Institute.
 In 1993, Sharp Grossmont opened the David and Donna Long Center for Cancer Treatment, San Diego County's first stand-alone cancer center offering diagnoses, treatment (chemotherapy), drug trials and radiation therapy in one location.

References

Hospitals in San Diego County, California
Companies based in San Diego